Henry Pelham Fiennes Pelham-Clinton, 5th Duke of Newcastle-under-Lyne,  (22 May 181118 October 1864), styled Earl of Lincoln before 1851, was a British politician.

Background
Newcastle was the son of Henry Pelham-Clinton, 4th Duke of Newcastle-under-Lyne, by his wife Georgina Elizabeth, daughter of Edward Miller-Mundy. He was educated at Eton and Christ Church, Oxford, where he took his B.A. degree in 1832, and was created a D.C.L. in 1863.

Political career
Newcastle was returned to Parliament for South Nottinghamshire in 1832, a seat he held until 1846, and then represented Falkirk Burghs until 1851, when he succeeded his father in the dukedom. Initially a Tory, he served under Sir Robert Peel as First Commissioner of Woods and Forests from 1841 to 1846 and as Chief Secretary for Ireland in 1846, as the effects of the Great Irish Famine began to take hold. He was admitted to the British Privy Council in 1841, and to the Irish Privy Council on 14 February 1846.

Newcastle joined the Peelites in 1846, and held office in Lord Aberdeen's coalition government as Secretary of State for War and the Colonies between 1852 and 1854, and as Secretary of State for War and Secretary at War between 12 June 1854 and 1 February 1855, when he resigned over the Crimean War.

From 18 June 1859 to April 1864, he served as Secretary of State for the Colonies in Lord Palmerston's Liberal administration. In 1860, while holding this office, he went to Canada and the United States, in company with the Prince of Wales. Apart from his political career he also held the honorary posts of Lord Lieutenant of Nottinghamshire from 1857 to 1864 and Lord Warden of the Stannaries from 1862 to 1864. He was made a Knight of the Garter on 17 December 1860.

Lord Lincoln was a member of the Canterbury Association from 27 March 1848. Upon succeeding to the dukedom, he joined the association's management committee on 29 January 1851. In 1849, the chief surveyor of the Canterbury Association, Joseph Thomas, named the future town of Lincoln in New Zealand after him.  The town's university was in turn also named after Lord Lincoln.

Family

Newcastle married Lady Susan Hamilton (9 June 181428 November 1889), daughter of Alexander Hamilton, 10th Duke of Hamilton, on 27 November 1832. They had five children:

Henry Pelham-Clinton, 6th Duke of Newcastle-under-Lyne (25 January 183422 February 1879), who married Henrietta Adela Hope (11 April 18438 May 1913) on 11 February 1861 and had five children.
Lord Edward William Pelham-Clinton (11 August 18369 July 1907), who married Matilda Jane Cradock-Hartopp (died 23 October 1892) on 22 August 1865.
Lady Susan Charlotte Catherine Pelham-Clinton (7 April 18396 September 1875), who married Lord Adolphus Vane-Tempest (2 July 182511 June 1864) on 23 April 1860. She was a mistress of Edward VII when he was Prince of Wales.
Lord Arthur Pelham-Clinton (23 June 184018 June 1870) who died, possibly by suicide, after being charged in the Boulton and Park case.
Lord Albert Sidney Pelham-Clinton (22 December 18451 March 1884), who married Mrs Frances Evelyn Stotherd on 17 November 1870; they were divorced in 1877.

The marriage was unhappy and the Duke and Duchess were divorced in 1850, after a considerable scandal in which the Duchess eloped with Horatio Walpole, Lord Walpole, and had an illegitimate child by him. Newcastle died in October 1864, aged 53, and was succeeded in the dukedom by his eldest son, Henry.

His papers are now held at Manuscripts and Special Collections, The University of Nottingham.

See also
Clinton, British Columbia
Clinton, South Australia

References

Attribution:

External links 
 
 Biography of the 5th Duke, with links to online catalogues, from Manuscripts and Special Collections at The University of Nottingham
 

Pictures of the Duke of Newcastle at the National Portrait Gallery

1811 births
1864 deaths
19th-century English nobility
People educated at Eton College
British Secretaries of State
005
Henry
English Anglicans
Knights of the Garter
Lord-Lieutenants of Nottinghamshire
Lincoln, Henry Pelham-Clinton, Earl of
Lincoln, Henry Pelham-Clinton, Earl of
Lincoln, Henry Pelham-Clinton, Earl of
Lincoln, Henry Pelham-Clinton, Earl of
Lincoln, Henry Pelham-Clinton, Earl of
Lincoln, Henry Pelham-Clinton, Earl of
Lincoln, Henry Pelham-Clinton, Earl of
UK MPs who inherited peerages
Members of the Privy Council of Ireland
Members of the Privy Council of the United Kingdom
Henry
Members of the Canterbury Association
Chief Secretaries for Ireland
Secretaries of State for the Colonies
Presidents of the Oxford Union